John Pinsent (2 November 1922 – 3 February 1995 in Liverpool, England) was an English classical scholar, especially in the area of Greek mythology. He founded and edited an academic journal on classical antiquity, the Liverpool Classical Monthly. It was established in 1976 and continued until 1995. Pinsent was its editor-in-chief for its complete lifespan and, because of this, it was sometimes known as Pinsent's Paper.

Pinsent was educated at St Edmund's School, Canterbury, followed by Oriel College, Oxford. His university studies were interrupted during World War II to serve in the Royal Air Force. He flew Catalina flying boats based at Loch Erne in Northern Ireland.

From 1950–1953, Pinsent was an assistant lecturer in Greek at Liverpool University, followed by becoming lecturer (1953–1969), senior lecturer (1969–1978), and reader (1978–1980). Between 1983–1987, he was Public Orator of the university. He authored several books on classical Greek subjects, including Greek  Mythology, first published in 1969. Pinsent's published books include:
 Greek Mythology (1969). .
 Myths & Legends of Ancient Greece (1969). .
 Myths and Legends of Ancient Greece (1973). .
 Military Tribunes and Plebeian Consuls, the Fasti from 444 V to 342 V (1975). .
 Dieux et Déesses de l'Olympe (1986). .

Pinsent was married three times, the third time to the former sister-in-law of the actor John Hurt. His surviving son is the cartoonist Ed Pinsent, and is from John's second marriage, as is his daughter.

References

1922 births
1995 deaths
People educated at St Edmund's School Canterbury
Alumni of Oriel College, Oxford
Royal Air Force personnel of World War II
English classical scholars
Scholars of Greek mythology and religion
Academic journal editors
Public orators
Academics of the University of Liverpool
Classical scholars of the University of Liverpool
English male writers
English rhetoricians